Bedout , or more specifically the Bedout High, is a geological and geophysical feature centered about  off the northwestern coast of Australia in the Canning and overlying Roebuck basins. The Bedout High was penetrated by two petroleum exploration wells (Bedout-1, Lagrange-1) in the 1970s and 1980s. It is named after nearby Bedout Island.

Impact hypothesis 
The impact hypothesis was developed further by Luanne Becker (University of California) and coworkers who claimed to have confirmed that the supposed volcanic rocks in the petroleum wells are actually impact melt breccia showing evidence of shock metamorphism, and re-dated these rocks at 250.1 ± 4.5 Ma. The new age is essentially coincident with the Permian–Triassic boundary and associated extinction event, and Becker speculates that there is a likely connection. It was subsequently reported, based on very limited preliminary data, that the impact hypothesis is further supported by chromium isotope evidence for the presence of extraterrestrial material.

Rebuttals to the impact hypothesis 
The Bedout impact hypothesis has not been widely supported by impact cratering specialists. Specific counter claims include:
 The alleged impact melt breccia actually has the characteristics of a volcanic basalt, in part altered by contact with sea water and metamorphism due to its deep burial, and the evidence for shock metamorphism is likely mistaken.
 A crater of the purported size would have produced a widespread layer of ejecta, but no such eject is evident at the nearest Permian-Triassic boundary sites in Australia.  
 The presented evidence for impact fails to meet established standards, and the dating methodology is flawed.
 A detailed re-evaluation of the geophysical data indicates that the evidence is not consistent with the expected properties of a giant impact crater, but rather the Bedout High was likely the result of episodes of continental rifting.

See also 

 List of possible impact structures on Earth

References

External links 
 Stephen Earle, "Double jeopardy at the end of the Permian - new evidence for a large impact"

Possible impact craters on Earth
Impact craters of Western Australia
Permian impact craters
Triassic impact craters
Permian Australia
Triassic Australia
Geography of the Indian Ocean
Permian–Triassic extinction event